was a Singapore-born Japanese businessman, former president of Ishikawajima-Harima Heavy Industries Co., head of the Japan Chamber of Commerce and Industry (1993–2001) and second president of Nippon Kaigi (1998–2001). He was a graduate of Azabu High School and Tokyo Institute of Technology. He joined the Ishikawajima Shibaura Turbine Co. in 1946. In 1962, the company merged with Ishikawajima-Shibaura Seiki Co. and Shibaura Sewing Machine Co. and changed its name to its current one. Inaba rose through the ranks as board director, managing director and senior vice president before becoming president of the company in 1983 and chairman in 1995. He was a recipient of the Order of the Rising Sun.

References

1924 births
2006 deaths
20th-century Japanese businesspeople
Tokyo Institute of Technology alumni
Azabu High School alumni
Grand Cordons of the Order of the Rising Sun
Members of Nippon Kaigi
Members of IHI Corporation
Singaporean emigrants to Japan